is a Japanese retired triple jumper. She was the 2009 East Asian Games silver medalist and 2011 Japanese national champion.

Personal best

International competition

National title
Japanese Championships
Triple jump: 2011

References

External links

Sayuri Takeda at Hokkaido High-Technology Athlete Club 

1989 births
Living people
Sportspeople from Hokkaido
Japanese female triple jumpers
Japan Championships in Athletics winners